Plaza Francia Orchestra is an international musical project of a trio of famous  musicians made up of Argentine Eduardo Makaroff and Swiss Christoph H. Müller both from Gotan Project as well as Catherine Ringer (from French band Les Rita Mitsouko) as main vocalist.

History

Originally founded as Plaza Francia post the release of the 2010 Gotan Project album Tango 3.0, Eduardo Makaroff and Christoph H. Müller collaborated with vocalist Catherine Ringer which resulted in their 7 April 2014 release A New Tango Song Book. The album came with critical acclaim and a commercial success in France also charting in Belgium. 

In 2018 Plaza Francia changed its name to Plaza Francia Orchestra and released a self titled album featuring Catherine Ringer, Lura and Maria Muliterno on vocals. They also collaborated on this record with Argentinean musicians Pablo Gignoli and Sebastian Volco. The album cover was designed by Argentinian artist Antonio Segui who was based in Paris. 

Today, Plaza Francia Orchestra continue to continue to tour, where they perform the repertoire as well as tracks released by Eduardo Makaroff and Christoph H. Müller under the moniker Müller & Makaroff.

Band name
The band was named after Plaza Francia - a real square in the chic Recoleta district of Buenos Aires that was built to celebrate the  friendship between France and Argentina, where Makaroff used to hang out with his counter-cultural mates, smoking weed in the 1970s.

Discography

Albums

References

External links 
Plaza Francia official website
Plaza Francia Facebook
Catherine Ringer official website
Müller and Makaroff official website

Tango music groups
Musical groups from Paris
French musical groups